The women's marathon at the 2003 All-Africa Games was held on October 16. This was the last time this event was contested at All-Africa Games as it was replaced with the half marathon from the next edition on.

Results

References
Results
Results

Marathon
2003 women